George F. Rebmann (10 April 1840 – 20 August 1918) was an American soldier who fought with the Union Army in the American Civil War. Rebmann received his country's highest award for bravery during combat, the Medal of Honor. Rebmann's medal was awarded for capturing a flag at the Battle of Fort Blakely, in Alabama on April 9, 1865. He was honored with the award on 8 June 1865.

Rebmann was born in Schuyler County in Illinois, where he later died.

Medal of Honor citation

See also
List of American Civil War Medal of Honor recipients: Q–S

References

1840 births
1918 deaths
American Civil War recipients of the Medal of Honor
People from Schuyler County, Illinois
People of Illinois in the American Civil War
Union Army officers
Burials in Illinois
United States Army Medal of Honor recipients